Des O'Dwyer (born 24 August 1961) is a former Australian rules footballer who played with Melbourne in the Victorian Football League (VFL) and Norwood, Woodville and Woodville-West Torrens in the South Australian National Football League (SANFL).

Notes

External links 

1961 births
Living people
Australian rules footballers from Victoria (Australia)
Melbourne Football Club players
Shepparton United Football Club players
Norwood Football Club players
Woodville Football Club players
Woodville-West Torrens Football Club players